Daniel George Munteanu (born 6 June 1978) is a Romanian former football player and currently a manager.

Honours

Player
FC Vaslui
UEFA Intertoto Cup: 2008

Coach
Aerostar Bacău
Liga III: 2019–20

External links

References

1978 births
Living people
Romanian footballers
Association football defenders
Liga I players
Liga II players
FCV Farul Constanța players
ASC Oțelul Galați players
FC Unirea Urziceni players
FC Vaslui players
FC Universitatea Cluj players
FC Delta Dobrogea Tulcea players
Azerbaijan Premier League players
Khazar Lankaran FK players
Romanian expatriate footballers
Romanian expatriate sportspeople in Azerbaijan
Expatriate footballers in Azerbaijan
Romanian football managers
CS Știința Miroslava managers
CS Aerostar Bacău managers